During My Apprenticeship is a 1919 German silent drama film directed by Hubert Moest and starring Hedda Vernon, Reinhold Schünzel, and Wilhelm Diegelmann. It is based on the nineteenth century novel From My Farming Days by Fritz Reuter.

The film's sets were designed by the art director Hans Dreier.

Cast

See also
Uncle Bräsig (1936)

References

Bibliography

External links

1919 films
Films of the Weimar Republic
German silent feature films
Films directed by Hubert Moest
German black-and-white films
Films based on German novels
German drama films
1919 drama films
Silent drama films
1910s German films
1910s German-language films